Elachista lorigera is a moth in the family Elachistidae. It was described by Edward Meyrick in 1921. It is found on Java.

The forewings are dark fuscous, speckled with whitish on the basal half and towards the dorsum. The hindwings are dark grey.

References

lorigera
moths described in 1921
moths of Asia